Vincent Waggoner Carr (October 1, 1918 – February 25, 2004) was an American politician who served as Speaker of the Texas House of Representatives and Attorney General of Texas.

References
http://www.cemetery.state.tx.us/pub/user_form.asp?step=1&pers_id=2621
http://mcadams.posc.mu.edu/russ/testimony/carr.htm
http://www.lib.utexas.edu/taro/ttusw/00062/00062-P.html
http://mcadams.posc.mu.edu/arrb/index63.htm
http://www.lrl.state.tx.us/legis/members/speakerElection.cfm?memberID=1007
Time (magazine)
http://www.pecos.net/news/arch62/052162.htm
http://www.cemetery.state.tx.us/pub/user_form.asp?step=1&pers_id=2622

External links
Carr Papers, 1945-85 and undated, in Southwest Collection/Special Collections Library at Texas Tech University

1918 births
2004 deaths
People from Lubbock, Texas
People from Hunt County, Texas
Texas lawyers
Warren Commission
University of Texas School of Law alumni
Lubbock High School alumni
Texas Tech University alumni
Texas Tech University System regents
Speakers of the Texas House of Representatives
Democratic Party members of the Texas House of Representatives
Burials at Texas State Cemetery
Deaths from cancer in Texas
Texas Attorneys General
United States Army Air Forces personnel of World War II
Military personnel from Texas